The 2018 Internationaux Féminins de la Vienne was a professional tennis tournament played on indoor hard courts. It was the twenty-second edition of the tournament and was part of the 2018 ITF Women's Circuit. It took place in Poitiers, France, on 22–28 October 2018.

Singles main draw entrants

Seeds 

 1 Rankings as of 15 October 2018.

Other entrants 
The following players received a wildcard into the singles main draw:
  Tessah Andrianjafitrimo
  Amandine Hesse
  Sabine Lisicki
  Margot Yerolymos

The following players received entry from the qualifying draw:
  Lou Adler
  Priscilla Heise
  Jesika Malečková
  Julia Terziyska

Champions

Singles

 Viktorija Golubic def.  Natalia Vikhlyantseva, 3–6, 6–1, 7–5

Doubles

 Anna Blinkova /  Alexandra Panova def.  Viktorija Golubic /  Arantxa Rus, 6–1, 6–1

External links 
 2018 Internationaux Féminins de la Vienne at ITFtennis.com
 Official website

2018 ITF Women's Circuit
2018 in French tennis
Internationaux Féminins de la Vienne